Sylvia Caloiaro (born 14 March 2001) is a Tanzanian swimmer.

She represented Tanzania at the 2019 World Aquatics Championships held in Gwangju, South Korea. She competed in the women's 50 metre freestyle event. She did not advance to compete in the semi-finals. She also competed in the women's 50 metre breaststroke event and in this event she also did not advance to compete in the semi-finals.

References 

Living people
2001 births
Place of birth missing (living people)
Tanzanian female swimmers
Tanzanian female freestyle swimmers
Female breaststroke swimmers